The 2023 Syracuse Orange football team will represent Syracuse University during the 2023 NCAA Division I FBS football season. The Orange will be led by eight-year head coach Dino Babers and play their home games at the JMA Wireless Dome, competing as members of the Atlantic Coast Conference.

Previous season

The Orange finished the season 7–6, 4–4 in ACC play to finish in fifth place in the Atlantic Division. The Orange were selected to participate in the Pinstripe Bowl, where they lost to Minnesota.

Schedule
Syracuse and the ACC announced the 2023 football schedule on January 30, 2023. The 2023 season will be the conference's first season since 2004, that its scheduling format just includes one division. The new format sets Syracuse with three set conference opponents, while playing the remaining ten teams twice in an (home and away) in a four–year cycle. The Orange three set conference opponents for the next four years is; Boston College, Florida State, and Pittsburgh.

Source:

Game summaries

Personnel

Coaching staff

After the season

Awards and ACC honors

References

Syracuse
Syracuse Orange football seasons
Syracuse Orange football